Preciosa (English: Precious) is a Mexican telenovela produced by Pedro Damián for Televisa in 1998.

On Monday, April 27, 1998, Canal de las Estrellas started broadcasting Preciosa weekdays at 7:00pm, replacing Mi pequeña traviesa. The last episode was broadcast on Friday, August 28, 1998 with Soñadoras replacing it the following Monday.

Irán Castillo and Mauricio Islas starred as protagonists, while Nailea Norvind, Felicia Mercado, Roberto Ballesteros and Bertha Moss starred as antagonists.

Cast 
 
Irán Castillo as Preciosa Ruiz/Estrella Ruiz
Mauricio Islas as Luis Fernando Santander
Nailea Norvind as Valeria San Román Valdivia de Santander
Francisco Gattorno as Álvaro San Román
Roberto Ballesteros as Sandor
Susana González as Felina
Alfonso Iturralde as Roberto San Román
Felicia Mercado as Enriqueta Valdivia de San Román
Ingrid Martz as Alma San Román
Bertha Moss as Eduarda Santander
Yula Pozo as Fermina
Marcela Pezet as Lorena
Luis Bayardo as Tito Ruiz
Rodrigo Vidal as Leonel de la Riva
Luis Gatica as Patricio
Adriana Fonseca as Vanessa
Carmen Salinas as Mamá Pachis
Norma Lazareno as Regina de la Riva
Luz Elena González as Milagros Ortiz
Khotan as Ransel
Sharis Cid as Zamira
Mayrin Villanueva as Claudia Ortiz
Héctor Suárez Gomís as Lorenzo "El Pantera" Ortiz
Raúl Padilla "Chóforo" as Libardo
Martha Ofelia Galindo as Chata
Eduardo Antonio as Father Juan Martín
René Casados as El Gran Sabu
Mauricio Aspe as El Gasolina
Osvaldo Benavides as Simón Ortiz
David Larible as Payaso Ángel
Uri Chartarifsky as Oscarito
Manola Diez as Inés
Alec Von Bargen as Orlando de la Riva
Alizair Gómez as "El Pirulo"
Dolores Salomón "Bodokito" as Finita
Eduardo Iduñate as Andrés
Francisco Rossell as Arturo
Ligia Robles as Luz Elena
Lisa Carbajal as Bianca
Jorge Poza as Robin
Ana Layevska as Princess
Eduardo Rodríguez as Leopoldino
Marieth Rodríguez as Rosalba Morantes/Miranda Barrios
Miguel Ángel Cardiel as Ariel Robles
Odiseo Bichir as Heriberto Robles
María Antonieta de las Nieves as La Chilindrina

Awards

References

External links

1998 telenovelas
Mexican telenovelas
1998 Mexican television series debuts
1998 Mexican television series endings
Spanish-language telenovelas
Television shows set in Mexico
Televisa telenovelas